Lliswerry, or Liswerry is an electoral district (ward) and community of the city of Newport, South Wales. The area is governed by Newport City Council. It is the largest community/ward in the city.

History and origins 
Lliswerry has been well known across the city for the railway bridge over Somerton Road with 'This is Lliswerry with 2 L's' painted in white across it. Lliswerry is an anglicised version of the Welsh place name Llyswyry translating to Maiden's Court. (Llys - Court, Gwyryf > Wyryf > Wyry - Maiden). It is believed that there was a manor house in the area belonging to the Welsh King of Brycheiniog. His daughter had connections to the manor/court. It was likely that the house was in the area of Traston Road today.

The King public house on Somerton Road was sold to an anonymous telephone buyer in May 2013 for £140,000. The pub, which was once known as the King of Prussia, was used as a base by Newport County; before Somerton Park had changing rooms, teams would change at the pub then walk along Somerton Road to play. The club would hold social gatherings and also do their laundry there.

Community boundaries 
The community is bounded by the River Usk to the west, Lilleshall Street and Telford Street to the northeast, the Great Western main line to the north, the original western end of Llanwern steelworks and Meadows Road to the east, and Nash Road, Traston Road, Corporation Road and Stephenson Street to the south. Lliswerry Ward is composed of both the Lliswerry and Nash communities.

Schools and colleges 
The ward is the site of the City of Newport Campus of Coleg Gwent (commonly referred to as 'Nash College') and the Newport International Sports Village. Lliswerry High School is adjacent to the college campus. Lliswerry also has a primary school, further north along Nash Road.

Churches 
Lliswerry has four churches: St. Andrew's Church in Wales church, in the benefice of Newport, Maindee and Newport, Lliswerry, is situated in Somerton Road; Lliswerry Baptist Church in Camperdown Road; Saint Patrick's Catholic Church in Cromwell Road, the only parish administered by the Rosminians in Newport; and St Philip's Church in Wales church in Jenkin Street.

Other amenities
There is a Post Office at 63, Somerton Road and a medical centre on Fallowfield Drive.

Lliswery Pond was formed, near the railway line, when quarrying excavations struck an underground stream which flooded that area. The pond was refurbished in 2008 and is maintained by many enthusiasts, as well as the local angling association, Alway Community Association and Newport City Council.

Sport 
The suburb is also home to the Newport International Sports Village and Newport Stadium which, from 1994 to 2012, was the home ground of the Newport County football team. Lliswerry A.F.C. are a football team which currently plays in the Gwent County League.

Lliswerry Runners have club sessions which are organised into six groups and have a junior club which began in 2016.

References

Further reading

External links 

Communities in Newport, Wales
Wards of Newport, Wales